Joseph Janela (born July 3, 1989) is an American professional wrestler. Janela is most known for his work with promotions such as All Elite Wrestling (AEW), Game Changer Wrestling (GCW), Pro Wrestling Guerrilla (PWG), Combat Zone Wrestling (CZW), and Major League Wrestling (MLW).

Early life
Joey Janela was born and raised in Hazlet, New Jersey. Janela would lie to professional wrestling promoters to start wrestling at age 15, telling them that he was of legal wrestling age and fully formally trained, which he has said in many interviews that he is not. Janela grew up a fan of deathmatches and the style of wrestling that became popular in Extreme Championship Wrestling and other promotions that sprung up once ECW went under. Janela became enthralled in the "high-risk, high-reward style of matches" presented in hardcore wrestling.

Professional wrestling career

Independent circuit (2006–present)

Janela made his professional wrestling debut at a 2006 National Wrestling Superstars show in which he lost in a Triple Threat match against JD Smooth and Corey Havoc. He would keep on working for them until the year of 2012 when World Xtreme Wrestling booked him in a match against Brandon Scott.

At Progress Wrestling's New York City event, Janela would debut losing to Jimmy Havoc in a No Disqualification match. In 2018 at Progress Chapter 66: Mardi Graps, he would participate in Progress Wrestling's Thunderbastard Battle Royal, he and other notable participants Austin Theory, Chris Brookes and Maxwell Jacob Friedman would lose to Jeff Cobb. Janela would participate in the company's Super Strong Style 16 Tournament at Progress Chapter 68 losing his first round to Zack Gibson. He would participate at the same event in a 6-man tag team match. On the last day of the tournament, he would win against Jimmy Havoc in a Deathmatch.

Janela recently has worked for Major League Wrestling, Game Changer Wrestling, Beyond Wrestling, Defy Wrestling, Smash Wrestling, AAW, and Chikara.

In September 2018, Janela suffered a knee injury during a match against Psicosis at a Game Changer Wrestling (GCW) event. Janela stated that MRI results showed that he suffered from a complete or near complete PCL tear, complete tear of the MCL distally, and ACL sprain, among numerous other injuries.

Janela hosted his third annual Spring Break event during WrestleMania 35 weekend. The events commenced over two days during the April 2019 weekend. On March 4, 2019, he released a video announcing that he will be returning from his injury at Spring Break 3. He returned in a match against Marko Stunt. Janela confirmed a Spring Break 4 during WrestleMania 36 weekend before Spring Break 3 even took place. On May 17, Janela revealed that Spring Break 4 would be held outdoors, with a capacity of 4,500. However, due to the Covid-19 pandemic, the show would be delayed until October of that year and held indoors with limited seating.
<p>In December 2018, Janela joined the commentary team for Mike Busey’s Sausage Castle Wrestling along with NFL player AJ Francis. This would be his only appearance for the promotion.

Combat Zone Wrestling (2014–2018)
Janela made his Combat Zone Wrestling debut in a 2014 Tournament of Valor match. He was in the first round against Dave McCall and lost. He would then be working with the company's training academy, "CZW/WSU Dojo", all the way up until CZW Sixteen where he fought Sozio and won. At Best of the Best 14, he was in a triple threat with CJP and Joe Gacy in which CJP got the victory. At CZW Proving Grounds 2015, he was in another triple threat but with Pepper Parks and Caleb Konley with Parks getting the victory. At CZW New Heights 2015, Janela was involved in a triple threat with Pepper Parks and Rich Swann with Parks getting another victory. At Down With The Sickness 2015 in a Fatal Four-Way match, Janela defeated Caleb Konley, Lio Rush and Trevor Lee.

At CZW Tangled Web 8, Janela faced CZW Wired TV champion Tim Donst and won. As CZW Wired TV champion, he would beat people like Joe Gacy and Lio Rush. At CZW Cage of Death XVII, Rush and Janela had a rematch with Rush gaining the victory and Janela losing the title. Moving on to CZW Down with the Sickness 2016, Janela & Rush had another match against each other for the CZW Wired TV championship in a ladder match with Janela regaining the title. At CZW Eighteen, he defeated Stockade to keep his championship. At The Wolf of Wrestling, Janela went face-to-face with Maxwell Jacob Friedman in which Janela succeeded to keep the championship. However at Cage of Death 19, Janela & Friedman had another match against each other in which Friedman won the title and Janela losing it. At CZW Nineteen in 2018, Janela was in a 30-Man #1 Contendership rumble in which Janela and the other 28 men were defeated by Maxwell Jacob Friedman. At Best of the Best 17, Janela participated in the first round of the tournament with Brandon Kirk, Joe Gacy and Rich Swann in which Gacy got the victory. This would also be the last CZW match of Janela as he announced later in the year that he quit working for the company.

Pro Wrestling Guerrilla (2017–2019)
In 2017, Janela made his Pro Wrestling Guerilla (PWG) debut in the first round of the Battle of Los Angeles 2017 tournament in which he lost to Sammy Guevara. In the same year, he would participate in PWG's All Star Weekend 13 in which he won his Tag 1 match against Trevor Lee. On his Tag 2 match, he would lose to Marty Scurll. At PWG Mystery Vortex V in 2018, he would defeat Flash Morgan Webster. At PWG Neon Knights, he would lose to Dalton Castle. Janela participated in the company's 14th All Star Weekend in which he lost his Tag 1 match to Jonah Rock. He would win his Tag 2 match however, facing against Robbie Eagles. At PWG Threemendous V, he would lose to Jeff Cobb. Janela participated in the company's Battle of Los Angeles 2018 tournament in which he won his first 2 matches. His first round being David Starr and his second round being Cima. He would lose his Semi-Final round to Bandido.

All Elite Wrestling (2019–2022)

In January 2019, it was revealed that Janela would be one of the first signees to All Elite Wrestling, a new wrestling promotion started by sports executive Tony Khan and wrestlers Cody Rhodes and The Young Bucks. His deal will allow him to still work independent wrestling dates. It was later revealed that Janela had signed a three-year deal with the company. 

He debuted for the company at their inaugural pay-per-view event Double or Nothing on May 25, where he competed in the pre-show Casino Battle Royale, but the match was won by Adam Page. At Fyter Fest in June, Janela lost to Jon Moxley in an unsanctioned match. The following month at Fight for the Fallen, Janela teamed with Darby Allin and Jimmy Havoc in a losing effort to Shawn Spears, MJF and Sammy Guevara. After the match, the three men would blame each other for the loss and brawl backstage. Subsequently, a three-way match was arranged for All Out on August 31, which Havoc won. On the October 22 episode of Dark, Janela picked up his first win in AEW, with a victory over Brandon Cutler. 

He would then start a feud with Shawn Spears, after Janela had disrespected Spears' manager Tully Blanchard. At Full Gear on November 9, Janela faced Spears in a losing effort. On the December 4 episode of Dynamite, Janela faced Jon Moxley in a rematch, which he also lost. At Double or Nothing on May 23, 2020, Janela competed in the Casino Ladder Match, which was won by the debuting Brian Cage. Janela’s AEW contract expired on May 1, 2022.

DDT Pro-Wrestling (2022)
On June 19, 2022, DDT Pro-Wrestling (DDT) announced Janela would be making his DDT debut in August, facing Shunma Katsumata in a hardcore match at Wrestle Peter Pan 2022.

Championships and accomplishments
Absolute Intense Wrestling
AIW Intense Championship (1 time)
JT Lightning Memorial Tournament (2018)
Alpha-1 Wrestling
A1 Outer Limits Championship (1 time)
Combat Zone Wrestling
CZW Wired TV Championship (3 times)
DDT Pro-Wrestling
DDT Extreme Championship (1 time)
Ironman Heavymetalweight Championship (4 times)
Dojo Pro Wrestling
Dojo Pro White Belt Championship (1 time)
Forza Lucha!
Forza Lucha Cup Championship (1 time)
Game Changer Wrestling
GCW Extreme Championship (1 time, current)
The Acid Cup (2016)
House of Glory
HOG Tag Team Championship (1 time) – with Anthony Gangone
Jersey Championship Wrestling
JCW Championship (1 time)
JCW Tag Team Championships (2 times) - with Sean Waltman and Rhett Titus
Tag Team Jersey J-Cup (2014)
National Wrestling Superstars
NWS Cruiserweight Championship (3 times)
On Point Wrestling
OPW Heavyweight Championship (1 time)
Pro Wrestling Illustrated
 Ranked No. 106 of the top 500 singles wrestlers in the PWI 500 in 2021
Pro Wrestling Syndicate
PWS (Suicidal Six Way/Tri State) Championship (3 times)
REW - Revolution Eastern Wrestling
REW Pakistan Championship (1 time)
WWNLive
WWN Championship (1 time)
World Xtreme Wrestling
WXW Blast Television Championship (1 time)
WrestlePro 
WrestlePro Tag Team Championship (1 time) - with Brian Myers

References

External links

1989 births
21st-century professional wrestlers
American male professional wrestlers
Living people
People from Hazlet, New Jersey
Professional wrestlers from New Jersey
Sportspeople from Monmouth County, New Jersey
CZW Wired Champions
DDT Extreme Champions
Ironman Heavymetalweight Champions